Olympia 06 is the name of the only live album recorded by the French singer Grégory Lemarchal. It was recorded during the only series of concerts given by the artist at the Olympia of Paris in 2006 in order to support his debut album Je deviens moi, and was released on October 23, 2006. It contains a cover version of Lucie Silvas' song "What You're Made of", recorded in live version as a duet with her, and another version with Nolwenn Leroy.

The album met success in France and in Belgium (Wallonia), particularly the DVD which was charted again just after the singer's death, topping the French Videos Chart on the chart edition of May 5, 2007. This DVD is currently still charted.

Formats and track listing

 CD album

 Digital download

 DVD

The DVD contains the same track listing.

Charts

CD

DVD

References

Grégory Lemarchal albums
Albums recorded at the Olympia (Paris)
2006 live albums
2006 video albums